White Explosion is a 1969 Soviet action film directed by Stanislav Govorukhin.

Plot 
The film takes place in 1942, when Soviet climbers saved the inhabitants of the Caucasus foothills by sacrificing themselves.

Cast 
 Sergey Nikonenko as Kolya Spichkin (as S. Nikonenko)
 Lyudmila Gurchenko as Vera Arsenova (as L. Gurchenko)
 Anatoliy Ignatyev as Vadim Baranov (as A. Ignatyev)
 Armen Dzhigarkhanyan as Artyom Arsenov (as A. Dzhigarkhanyan)
 Fyodor Odinokov as Semyon Ivanovich (as F. Odinokov)
 Leo Pilpani as Shota Iliani (as L. Pilpani)
 Bukhuti Zakariadze as Tengiz Aleksandrovich (as B. Zakariadze)
 Stepan Krylov
 Nikolai Fyodortsov
 A. Ivanov

References

External links 
 

1969 films
1960s Russian-language films
Soviet action films
1960s action films